Puerto Rico Highway 122 (PR-122) is mostly an avenue connecting downtown San Germán with Highway 2. After intersecting with Highway 166, the avenue ends and the highway becomes a narrow, rural road until its end.

Major intersections

See also

 List of highways numbered 122

References

External links
 

122